April Rose Dizon Matienzo  (born April 12, 1996), better known by her screen name Charlie Dizon, is a Filipino actress, model and singer.

Career

Dizon made her acting debut in 2017 in the film Finally Found Someone, it was followed by appearances, in the same year, in the films Loving in Tandem, and Seven Sundays.

In 2018, Dizon appeared in the film Sin Island. Prior to her appearance in the said film, she was credited using her real name and was not formally introduced using her stage name until a month later. In March, Dizon was one of the thirteen aspiring actors introduced by Star Magic dubbed the 2018 Star Magic Circle and would make her television debut in Bagani.

A year later, Dizon appeared in the fantasy-drama series Parasite Island.

In 2020, Dizon appeared in the television series A Soldier's Heart and in the films Four Sisters Before the Wedding and Fan Girl. Dizon's portrayal of titular fan girl earned her the Best Actress Award in the Metro Manila Film Festival. 

She is set to appear in the television series My Sunset Girl and Viral Scandal in 2021.

Filmography

Television

Film

Awards and nominations

References

External links
 
 

1996 births
Living people
Filipino female models
Filipino film actresses
Filipino television actresses
21st-century Filipino women singers
ABS-CBN personalities